This article lists fellows of the Royal Society elected in 1941.

Fellows 

Noel Benson
Homi Jehangir Bhabha
Sir Edward Bullard
Sir Winston Churchill
Cyril Dean Darlington
Philip Ivor Dee
Sir Sheldon Francis Dudley
 Sir John Carew Eccles
 Howard Florey
Alan Arnold Griffith
Sir Harry Work Melville
Joseph Needham
Sir Albert Cherbury David Rivett
Alexander Robertson
Thomas Gerald Room
Arthur John Rowledge
Hugh Scott
Sir Franz Eugen Simon
Sir Henry Gerard Thornton
Sir Robert Alexander Watson-Watt
Philip Bruce White

Foreign members

James Bryant Conant
Karl Landsteiner

References

1941
1941 in science
1941 in the United Kingdom